Thunderground is a 1989 action film directed by David Mitchell and starring Michael Copeman, Paul Coufos, Pete Dempster, Margaret Langrick, and M. Emmet Walsh.

Plot summary
A con-artist meets a tough fighter and sees him as her ticket to a better life. The two make an agreement and head off to New Orleans to arrange a match with "the man" - the mysterious king of bare-knuckled boxing. There are no rules for this fight...one man wins when the other dies.

Cast
 Michael Copeman as Cody
 Paul Coufos as "Bird"
 Pete Dempster as Rhubarb
 Donny Lalonde as Minister
 Margaret Langrick as Casey
 Kenneth W. Roberts as Cook
 William Sanderson	as "Ratman"
 Ric Sarabia as "Moondog"
 Michael Scherer as Jim "Jimbo"
 Warren Van Evera as "Red Rider"
 Jesse Ventura as The Man
 M. Emmet Walsh as Wedge

External links

1989 films
American action films
Canadian action films
English-language Canadian films
1989 action films
1980s adventure films
1980s sports films
American boxing films
Films set in New Orleans
Films shot in Toronto
Films produced by Damian Lee
Films about con artists
Films with screenplays by Damian Lee
1980s English-language films
1980s American films
1980s Canadian films